On 14 January 2019, a Boeing 707 operated by Saha Airlines on a cargo flight crashed at Fath Air Base, near Karaj, Alborz Province in Iran. Fifteen of the sixteen people on board were killed. This aircraft was the last civil Boeing 707 in operation.

Aircraft

The aircraft involved was a Boeing 707-3J9C, c/n 21128, registration EP-CPP. The aircraft was owned by the Islamic Republic of Iran Air Force and had been leased to Saha Airlines. The aircraft was 42 years old at the time. The aircraft had first flown on 19 November 1976, and was delivered that month to the Imperial Iranian Air Force as 5–8312. It had been transferred to Saha Airlines on 27 February 2000, and was re-registered EP-SHK. It was substantially damaged by an uncontained engine failure on 3 August 2009, whilst on a flight from Ahvaz International Airport to Mehrabad International Airport, Tehran. An emergency landing was made at Ahvaz; the aircraft was subsequently repaired. It was returned to the IRIAF in December 2015 and returned to Saha Airlines in May 2016, registered EP-CPP.

Accident

The aircraft was on an international cargo flight carrying meat from Manas International Airport in Bishkek, Kyrgyzstan, to Payam International Airport in Karaj, Iran, but the flight crew actually landed at Fath Air Base. The crew probably mistook Fath Air Base's runway for the much longer Payam International Airport runway, as the two runways are just a few kilometres apart, and on an almost identical alignment. Poor weather conditions were also reported.

The aircraft overran the runway, crashed through a wall, and came to rest after colliding with a house in the neighbourhood of Farrokhabad, Fardis County, Alborz Province. The houses involved were empty at the time of the crash, and no one on the ground was injured. Following the crash, a fire developed. Early reports gave the number of people on board as either 16 or 17 (one a woman), all but one of whom died. The sole survivor was Farshad Mahdavinejad, the aircraft's flight engineer, who was taken to Shariati Hospital in a critical condition.

In a possibly related incident from 16 November 2018, a Taban Airlines MD-88 carrying 155 people twice attempted to land on this runway, mistaking it for the longer  Payam runway, which is nearly in line. On its first approach, the plane reached an altitude of  before aborting the attempt, but eventually continued on for a safe landing at Payam after an aborted second attempt at Fath.

Investigation
An investigation was opened into the accident. The cockpit voice recorder was recovered from the wreckage on 14 January. The flight data recorder and the control display unit were also recovered.

See also 

 List of accidents and incidents involving the Boeing 707
 List of accidents and incidents involving airliners by airline (P–Z)
 List of sole survivors of airline accidents or incidents
 Spantax flight on 31 May 1967, whose pilot (and CEO) mistook the tiny runway of Finkenwerder for Hamburg Airport
 TAM Airlines Flight 3054

References

External links

2019 in Iran
Accidents and incidents involving the Boeing 707
Aviation accidents and incidents in 2019
Aviation accidents and incidents in Iran
January 2019 events in Iran
Airliner accidents and incidents involving runway overruns